, also known as First Gundam, Gundam 0079 or simply Gundam '79, is an anime television series, produced and animated by Nippon Sunrise. Created and directed by Yoshiyuki Tomino, it premiered in Japan on Nagoya Broadcasting Network and its affiliated ANN stations on April 7, 1979, and lasted until January 26, 1980, spanning 43 episodes. It was the first Gundam series, which has subsequently been adapted into numerous sequels and spin-offs. Set in the futuristic calendar year "Universal Century" 0079, the plot focuses on the war between the Principality of Zeon and the Earth Federation, with the latter unveiling a new giant robot known as the RX-78-2 Gundam piloted by the teenage civilian mechanic Amuro Ray.

In 1981, the series was re-edited for theatrical release and split into three films. The characters were designed by Yoshikazu Yasuhiko, and Kunio Okawara was responsible for the mechanical designs, including the eponymous giant robot, the RX-78-2 Gundam. The first film was released on February 22, 1981. Tomino himself also wrote a trilogy of novels that retell the events of the series. Two manga adaptations of the series have also been written by two manga artists.

Despite initial low ratings that caused the series' cancellation, the popularity of Gundam saw a boost from the introduction of Bandai's Gunpla models in 1980 and from reruns and the theatrical release of the anime, leading to the creation of a prolific and lucrative media and toy franchise. The series is famous for revolutionizing the giant robot genre due to the handling of mobile suits as weapons of war, as well as the portrayal of their pilots as ordinary soldiers. This aspects contrasted with the previous style of portraying hero pilots and their giant super hero robots.

Plot

Set in a fictional universe  (Universal Century year 0079 according to the Gundam Calendar), the Principality of Zeon has declared independence from the Earth Federation, and subsequently launched a war of independence called the One Year War. The conflict has directly affected every continent on Earth, also nearly every space colony and lunar settlement. Zeon, though smaller, has the tactical upper hand through their use of a new type of humanoid weapons called mobile suits. After half of all humanity perishes in the conflict, the war settled into a bitter stalemate lasting over 8 months.

The story begins with a newly deployed Federation warship, the White Base, arriving at the secret research base located at the Side 7 colony to pick up the Federation's newest weapon. However, they are closely followed by Zeon forces. A Zeon reconnaissance team member disobeys mission orders and attacks the colony, killing most of the Federation crew and civilians in the process. Out of desperation, young Amuro Ray accidentally finds the Federation's new prototype arsenal—the RX-78 Gundam, and manages to beat back Zeon forces. Scrambling everything they can, the White Base sets out with her newly formed crew of civilian recruits and refugees in her journey to survive.

On their journey, the White Base members often encounter the Zeon Lieutenant Commander Char Aznable. Although Char antagonizes Amuro in battle, he takes advantage of their position as Federation members to have them kill members from Zeon's Zabi family as part of his revenge scheme. Amuro also meets ensign Lalah Sune with whom he falls in love, but accidentally kills when facing Char. When the Federation Forces invade the Fortress of A Baoa Qu to defeat the Zeon forces, Amuro engages on a final one-on-one duel against Char due to both blaming the other for Lalah's death. Having realized he forgot his true enemy, Char stops fighting to kill the last surviving Zabi member, Kycilia Zabi. Amuro then reunites with his comrades as the war reaches its end.

Production

The "Mobile Suits" of the show were inspired by the powered armor from the novel Starship Troopers from 1959. Mobile suits were conceptualized as human-like robots which would not only appeal to children. Yoshiyuki Tomino's original plot for the anime was considerably much more grim, with Amuro dying halfway through the series, and the crew of the White Base having to ally with Char (who is given a red Gundam), but finally having to battle him after he takes control of the Principality of Zeon. The original concept found expression in a series of novels written by Tomino soon after the show's conclusion, and elements of the storyline weaved themselves into Zeta Gundam and Char's Counterattack.

In previous series Tomino worked in, villains were alien agents. Mobile Suit Gundam was the first of his work which featured humans as antagonists. The director commented he wanted to tell a story about war. He aimed to expose thoroughly starting with Japanese aggression in Manchuria in 1939. Tomino did not allow for changes to history and wanted to use the story to make viewers confront the tragic realities of war. The director was unwilling to discuss the message of his work, expecting the viewers to reach their own conclusion. Additionally, he commented he "packed his frustrations" when making Gundam.

Tomino met mechanical designer Kunio Okawara when he first worked in two television series from Sunrise. Tomino liked Okawara's work and asked him to collaborate with him in his upcoming project. Originally, the anime would be called "Gunboy" but it was renamed Mobile Suit Gundam. The White Base, the mothership of the protagonist crew members, is designed with a 3 plane view method by Kunio Okawara, however, it is not specially designed for the anime series Gundam, it was actually a salvaged design from the anime Invincible Steel Man Daitarn 3. The idea of having a space carrier from Tomino is partly inspired by the earlier science fiction anime Space Battleship Yamato, which he claimed to be a fan of. It was intended to be in a more realistic black color, but was changed to white by the order of Sunrise, who similarly ordered the main mecha, Gundam, changed from a grayish white to white, red, blue and yellow. Director Tomino showed great disgust in the color change, also noticing the unrealistic non-aerodynamic design of it after the show was on air, said in an interview that such design would never appear in the real world, since it would be a sitting duck from fighter aircraft. Tomino still held a grudge 10 years after the show aired and stated in an interview in Newtype 1989 April issue that the imaginary enemies of Gundam are Sunrise, sponsors and television stations.

Tomino compares the machines with religious history in Japan, most notably the worship of Buddha statues located in temples. The relationship between the pilot and the mobile suit has also been compared with the Formula One drivers who rely on machines to achieve a goal. In order to give the mechas fast movements, most of the fights were situated in space where there was low gravity. This led to the creation of space colonies as a common setting. In order to explain how a person as young as Amuro could pilot the Gundam, the team came up with the idea of Newtypes.

Media

Anime

In February 1980, Mobile Suit Gundam was aired in Italy, the first country to broadcast the show outside Japan. In Australia, Seven Network  broadcast the anime in Japanese with English subtitles from 1982 to 1984. Mobile Suit Gundam was also later aired by the anime satellite television network, Animax, across Japan, with the series continuing to be aired on the network currently, and later its respective networks worldwide, including Hong Kong, Southeast Asia, South Asia, and other regions.

Hoping to capitalize on the success of Gundam Wing from the previous year, Bandai Entertainment released a heavily edited and English-dubbed version of Mobile Suit Gundam, premiering on Cartoon Network's Toonami weekday afternoon after-school action programming block across the United States on Monday, July 23, 2001. The series did not do as well as Wing but the ratings were high enough for the whole series to be aired and to spawn an enormous toy line. Due to 9-11, Cartoon Network, like many other American TV stations, began pulling, and editing, war-themed content and violent programming, resulting in the cancellation of the series. However, the series finale was shown as part of Toonami's "New Year's Eve-il" special on December 31, 2001. On Saturday, June 8, 2002, the series was given another chance by Cartoon Network on their late-night Adult Swim block, starting over from the first episode, but it was again pulled before completing its run because of low ratings.

On May 30, 2006, Bandai Entertainment re-released the English dub of the TV series in a 10 volume DVD set. There was no Japanese audio track included, apparently because Yoshiyuki Tomino felt that the original mono mix was in too poor of a condition to use. However, in 2007 the original series was released on DVD in Japan, which sold over 100,000 copies within a month's time from December 21, 2007 to January 21, 2008.

Only one episode out of the 43 episodes ("Cucuruz Doan's Island") had never been dubbed nor aired. This was at the request of Yoshiyuki Tomino, as he felt that it was not on par with the other episodes, resulting in the episode becoming a "lost episode" of sorts. Despite this, the episode was included on Japanese DVD and Blu-ray releases, and was dubbed in Italian in the early 1980s.

At the 2010 New York Comic Con/New York Anime Festival, Bandai Entertainment announced that they would re-release Mobile Suit Gundam with both the original Japanese audio and the English dub. Bandai released it in two sets in the summer of 2011. The first set was released on September 13, 2011.

Following the closure in 2012 of Bandai Entertainment, the series went out of print. At their New York Comic-Con 2014 panel, Sunrise announced their plans to re-release all of the Gundam series on home video in North America, starting with the original series. They would be distributed via Right Stuf Inc. They released the series on Blu-ray and DVD in October 2015.

On July 25, 2015, British anime distributor Anime Limited announced they would release Mobile Suit Gundam in cooperation with Sunrise for the first time in the UK on DVD and Blu-ray.

Novel
In 1979, before the end of the anime, Yoshiyuki Tomino himself created the first novelizations of the original Gundam anime series. The novels, issued as a series of three books, allowed him to depict his story in a more sophisticated, adult, and detailed fashion. Along with this adaptation came several major changes to the story. For example, Amuro is already a member of the Federation military at the time of the initial Zeon attack on Side 7, and the main characters in the Federation serve on the White Base-class ships Pegasus and Pegasus II rather than the Pegasus-class White Base. Additionally, the war continues well into the year UC 0080 in the novels, whereas it concludes at the beginning of that year in the anime series. In the novel Amuro Ray is killed in the final attack against the Zeonic stronghold of A Baoa Qu when his RX-78-3 is pierced through the torso by a Rick Dom's beam bazooka. This occurs as Char's unit attempts to warn him about Gihren's intention to destroy the fortress and take the Federation's offensive fleet along with it. Char and the crew of Pegasus II (White Base), along with handpicked men under Kycilia Zabi's command, make a deep penetrating attack against the Side 3 and together kill Gihren Zabi, after which Kycilia is killed by Char. Tomino later lamented that had he known that anime ending would be different and that another series would be made, he would not have killed off Amuro in the novels.

The three novels were translated into English by Frederik Schodt and published by Del Rey Books in September 1990. At the time, there were no officially recognized romanizations of character and mecha names, and a variety of different spellings were being used in the English-language fan community. In the original three novels, therefore, Mr. Schodt wrote the name "Char" as "Sha." "Sha" is a transliteration of the Japanese pronunciation, although Mr. Tomino later publicly confirmed at Anime Expo New York 2002 that the name was originally based on the French name Charles Aznavour, a popular French-language singer. (The 2004 edition of the English translation revealed that Schodt felt that the "Char" rendering "seemed too close" to Aznavour's name.) He also rendered "Zaku" as "Zak," and (after consulting with Mr. Tomino) "Jion" as "Zeon," instead of "Zion," which was in use in some circles. Some North American fans, already attached to particular spellings, took great umbrage at Schodt's renditions, forgetting that in the original Japanese most character and mecha names are written in katakana, and that there were, therefore, no "official spellings." Many years later, when the Gundam series was finally licensed in North America, the rights holders came up with a unified list of "official spellings" for English-language material, and some of these spellings include Schodt's renditions, as well as the renditions to which certain North American fans were attached.

In 2004, Frederik Schodt revised his original translation of the books, which had been out of print for nearly a decade. What had been a three volume set in the 1990 Del Rey edition was re-released by Stone Bridge Press as one single volume of 476 pages (with a vastly improved cover design), titled Mobile Suit Gundam: Awakening, Escalation, Confrontation. Since the rights holders in Japan by this time had created a unified (although still evolving) list of romanized character and mecha names, Schodt was able to use it, and Amuro's rival in the novel thus became "Char" and not "Sha"; the popular Zeon Mobile Suit, similarly, became "Zaku," and not "Zak".

Films
Following the success of the Mobile Suit Gundam TV series, in 1981 Tomino reworked the footage into three separate compilation films. The first two films, Mobile Suit Gundam and Mobile Suit Gundam: Soldiers of Sorrow, were released in 1981. The third film, Mobile Suit Gundam: Encounters in Space, was released in 1982.

Each of the three films is largely composed of old footage from the TV series, however Tomino felt that some things could be changed for the better. Tomino removed several aspects of the show which he felt were still too super robot-esque for the real robot series he intended Gundam to be, such as the Gundam Hammer weapon. The G-Armor upgrade parts were also completely removed and replaced in the narrative by the more realistic Core Booster support fighters, and Hayato receives a RX-77 Guncannon at Jaburo to replace the disadvantaged RX-75 Guntank. The third film also includes a substantial amount of new footage expanding on the battles of Solomon and A Baoa Qu.

The first Gundam film, upon release on 22 February 1981, drew a large crowd of 15,000 people at its premiere, leading to concerns from police and media that it could lead to social unrest from a riotous crowd. The event is considered a turning point in the history of anime, referred to as "the day that anime changed" according to Asahi Shimbun newspaper. The first film grossed , and Gundam II grossed . Collectively, the trilogy grossed  at the Japanese box office.

In 1998, the three compilation films were first released directly to VHS subtitled into English as part of Bandai's AnimeVillage releases, which makes them among the first Gundam works released in English. A year later, Bandai released an English dub of three compilation films in 1999. Featuring the voice of Michael Lindsay as Amuro Ray, and Steve Blum as Char Aznable. Due to the dub mispronouncing the word Gundam as "Gun-dam", and the Principality of Zeon being called the "Duchy of Zeon", Sunrise prevented it from being re-released after its debut on VHS. The films were released again in North America on May 7, 2002 in DVD format, available separately or in a boxed set. These are also available only with re-done Japanese audio with English subtitles, the DVDs identical to the 20th anniversary release of the film compilation in Japan. The original Japanese voice cast members rerecorded their lines with the exception of those who were deceased. The 20th anniversary release was digitally remastered and many of the sound effects were replaced, most notably the futuristic gun sounds being replaced by louder machine gun sound effects. Also, the music soundtrack, while not remixed was rearranged and in some cases removed from some scenes. The vocal songs are rearranged also, especially in the closing credits of the second and third films.

Bandai Visual has announced the re-release of the Mobile Suit Gundam films on DVD from new HD masters and with the original, theatrical, mono audio mix. This boxed set was released in Japan on December 21, 2007. On May 18, 2010, Bandai Entertainment re-released the 20th anniversary version of the trilogy under their Anime Legends label. As with the TV series, the films were re-released in North America under Sunrise themselves with distribution from Right Stuf Inc.

The trilogy of films were distributed on DVD in the United Kingdom by Beez Entertainment in 2005 in Japanese and with a selection of subtitle tracks including English. Anime Ltd. has since acquired the UK license and has released a limited edition Blu-ray box set of the film trilogy (limited to 500 units) as an exclusive, sold only on their AllTheAnime.com store. It was released on March 27, 2017, in Japanese with English subtitles only.

A animated film adaptation based on the "Cucuruz Doan's Island" episode titled  was released on June 3, 2022.

Manga
There have been three manga series based on Mobile Suit Gundam. One was written by Yū Okazaki between 1979 and 1980 and compiled into two volumes. Another is Mobile Suit Gundam 0079 by Kazuhisa Kondo. It was published in Dengeki Comics from 1993 to 2005 in a total of twelve tankōbon volumes. Viz Media published its first nine volumes in English between 2000 and 2003. The third manga is Mobile Suit Gundam: The Origin by anime character designer Yoshikazu Yasuhiko. It was published from June 2001 to June 2011 in Kadokawa Shoten's Gundam Ace magazine and collected in a total of 23 tankōbon volumes. The series was first released in English by Viz Media but was dropped before it was completed; it was then released by Vertical from March 2013 to December 2015.

Besides adaptations, there is a popular parody yonkoma manga titled Mobile Suit Gundam-san, which was written and drawn by Hideki Ohwada and serialized in Kadokawa Shoten's Gundam Ace magazine since 2001.  This manga was adapted into an anime in 2014.  Ohwada also created a spinoff manga, which follows Yoshiyuki Tomino and the Sunrise staff as they work to make the television series and the compilation films. This series was serialized in Kadokawa Shoten's Gundam Ace magazine from 2009 to 2011 and compiled in the Gundam-san tankōbon starting in Volume 5. The manga was also collected in two tankōbon volumes released on January 24, 2014.

A continuation of the Mobile Suit Gundam 0079 manga, titled Mobile Suit Gundam 0079 Episode II Luna, began serialization in Kadokawa Shoten's Gundam Ace magazine on November 26, 2022.

Video games

(For the list below, only video games featuring mobile suits that appeared in the One Year War, or related variations are included.)

There have been many video games based on or with mobile suits from the original Gundam series. Of these, the following have been released in North America:
 Gundam Battle Assault, Gundam Battle Assault 2
 Gundam Side Story 0079: Rise From the Ashes
 Mobile Suit Gundam: Journey to Jaburo
 Mobile Suit Gundam: Zeonic Front
 Mobile Suit Gundam: Federation vs. Zeon
 Mobile Suit Gundam: Encounters in Space
 Mobile Suit Gundam: Gundam vs. Zeta Gundam
 Mobile Suit Gundam: Crossfire (Mobile Suit Gundam: Target in Sight in Japan and Australia)
 MS Saga: A New Dawn (Mobile Suit Gundam: True Odyssey in Japan)
 Dynasty Warriors: Gundam, Dynasty Warriors: Gundam 2, Dynasty Warriors: Gundam 3 (Gundam Musou in Japan)
 Dynasty Warriors: Gundam Reborn (PlayStation 3 only)

Games that have been unreleased in countries outside Japan include:
 Gundam 0079 The War for Earth
 Mobile Suit Gundam (1993 arcade game)
 Mobile Suit Gundam: Spirits of Zeon ~Dual Stars of Carnage~ Mobile Suit Gundam: Spirit of Zeon ~Memory of Soldier~Quiz Mobile Suit Gundam: MonsenshiGiren's Greed (series)
 Mobile Suit Gundam: Lost War Chronicles Mobile Suit Gundam: Climax UCMobile Suit Gundam: The One Year WarMobile Suit Gundam: Path of the Soldiers (also referred to as Ace Pilot)
 Gundam Battle (series)
 SD Gundam G Generation (series)
 SD Gundam: Scad Hammers Mobile Suit Gundam: Operation: Troy Mobile Suit Gundam: Bonds of the Battlefield Mobile Suit Gundam: Gundam vs. GundamReception, influence and legacyGundam was not popular when it first aired, and in fact came close to being cancelled. The series was originally set to run for 52 episodes but was cut down to 39 by the show's sponsors, which included Clover (the original toymakers for the series). However, the staff was able to negotiate a one-month extension to end the series with 43 episodes. When Bandai bought the copyrights to build plastic models for the show's mecha, which was a relatively new market compared to the old Chogokin series Clover was making, things changed completely. With the introduction of their line of Gundam models, the popularity of the show began to soar. The models sold very well, the show began to do very well in reruns and its theatrical compilation was a huge success. Audiences were expecting another Super Robot TV show, and instead found Gundam, the first work of anime in an entirely new genre: the Real Robot genre. The Anime ranked #2 on Wizard's Anime Magazine on their "Top 50 Anime released in North America", and is regarded as changing the concept of Japanese robot anime and the turning point of history in Japan.

Despite being released in 1979, the original Gundam series is still remembered and recognized within the anime fan community. The series revolutionized mecha anime, introducing the new Real Robot genre, and over the years became synonymous with the entire genre for many. As a result, for example, parodies of mecha genre commonly feature homages to Mobile Suit Gundam, thanks to its immediate recognizability.

The series was the first winner of the Animage Anime Grand Prix prize, in 1979 and the first half of 1980. In the top 100 anime from Animage, Gundam was twenty-fourth. The magazine Wizard listed the series as the second best anime of all time. By the end of 2007, each episode of the original TV series averaged a sales figure of 80,928 copies, including all of the different formats it was published in (VHS, LD, DVD, etc.). The first DVD box set sold over 100,000 copies in the first month of release, from December 21, 2007 to January 21, 2008. As part of the 30th Anniversary of the Gundam series, the company officially announced a project on March 11, 2009 called Real-G, a plan to build a 1:1 real size scale Gundam in Japan. It was completed in July 2009 and displayed in a Tokyo park then taken down later. The 18-meter tall statue was reconstructed in Shizuoka Prefecture and was taken down in March 2011. In August 2011 it was dismantled only to reopen in Odaiba, Tokyo on April 19, 2012. It stood Odaiba along with a gift shop called "Gundam Front Tokyo" until it was dismantled in March 2016.

Most of the critical response to the series has been due to the setting and characters. John Oppliger observes that the characters of Amuro Ray, to whom the young Japanese of that time could easily relate, and Char Aznable, who was "simply [...] fascinating", made a major contribution to the series' popularity. He also concludes that "in many respects First Gundam stands for the nostalgic identifying values of everything that anime itself represents". The series has been praised by Anime News Network for the way it portrays war with Amuro facing traumatic moments as a result of killing enemy soldiers in his becoming of a soldier. The series is also notable for having humans from a different race as antagonists rather than evil creatures. However, the animation has been noted to have notoriously aged when compared with series seen in the 2000s.

Mecha anime creator Shoji Kawamori attended Keio University in the same years as Macross screenwriter Hiroshi Ōnogi and character designer Haruhiko Mikimoto, where they had a Mobile Suit Gundam fan club called "Gunsight One", a name they would use years later as the call sign of the bridge of the SDF-1 spaceship from their first Macross anime television series. In fact, The Super Dimension Fortress Macross mecha anime series was inspired by Gundam in several aspects during its early development. Guillermo del Toro has cited the series as an influence on Pacific Rim.

American musician Richie Kotzen, former guitarist from Poison and Mr. Big, released an album called Ai Senshi ZxR in 2006 in Japan. The album consisted of covered music from the Gundam series and original songs. American musician Andrew W.K. also released an album called Gundam Rock on September 9, 2009, in Japan. The album consists of covered music from the Gundam series to celebrate its 30th Anniversary.

Background research
The background research of Mobile Suit Gundam is well praised in its field. The positions in which the colonies (sides) are located in orbit are called Lagrangian points, and are real world solutions to the three-body problem. The colonies (sides) are based on the O'Neill cylinder design for space habitats.Gundam SF World The Gundam franchise was a major contributing factor to the fame of the O'Neil cylinder in Japan.

Rides
"Gundam the Ride: A Baoa Qu" was an amusement park attraction at the Fuji-Q Highland Amusement Park located in Fujiyoshida, Yamanashi, Japan. It was a dark ride for the park. Gundam the Ride, which opened to the public on July 20, 2000, was based on Mobile Suit Gundam. Set during the final chaotic Battle of A Baoa Qu, Gundam the Ride places its riders in an Escape Launch Shuttle about to leave the battleship Suruga.

The animation of Gundam the Ride used mostly computer graphics, however, all human characters were hand-drawn cel animation, similar to the style current Gundam video games are done in. All of the character designs for Gundam the Ride were done by Haruhiko Mikimoto. The ride's characters make a cameo appearance in the video game "Encounters in Space" while the player (playing as Amuro Ray in his Gundam) is making his way through the Dolos.

The ride closed on January 8, 2007 and replaced with "Gundam Crisis Attraction" The main feature of this attraction is a full size 1:1 Gundam model, lying flat inside the venue. Instead of sitting in a movable cockpit and watching a CG movie, it requires participants to carry handheld devices throughout the attraction to find certain pieces of information, similar to a scavenger hunt, in order to activate the Gundam. The interior of the attraction is a mock-up of a Federation ship, and employees remain in-character inside of the ride.

See also

 Bildungsroman
 Gundam Gundam model
 Gundam (fictional robot)
 Super Dimension Fortress Macross (1982)
 Genesis Climber Mospeada (1983) 
 Super Dimension Cavalry Southern Cross'' (1984)

Notes

References

External links

 Official Website: Anime
 
 
 

 
 

 
 

 
 
1979 anime television series debuts
1981 anime films
1982 anime films
Akita Shoten manga
Animated space adventure television series
Anime with original screenplays
Anti-war works
Bandai Entertainment anime titles
Dengeki Comics
Fiction about telepathy
Films set in a fictional country
Kadokawa Shoten manga
Military science fiction
Shōnen manga
Sunrise (company)
Toonami
Vertical (publisher) titles
Viz Media manga